SaltWire Network Inc. is a Canadian newspaper publishing company owned by the Dennis-Lever family of Halifax, Nova Scotia, owners of The Chronicle Herald. Saltwire owns 23 daily and weekly newspapers in Atlantic Canada.  The company was formed in 2017 via its purchase of 27 newspapers from Transcontinental.

History 
On April 13, 2017, Halifax's independently owned The Chronicle Herald announced its acquisition of 27 newspapers in the region from Transcontinental Media, via the newly formed parent company SaltWire Network. The company had begun a gradual exit from mainstream publishing in order to focus on specialty media and educational publishing. The exact purchase price was not disclosed, although business analysts estimated that the publications were worth approximately $30 million in total. The transaction was criticized by a number of analysts, as it occurred in the middle of a strike by Chronicle Herald employees during which the paper had claimed declining revenues as its reason for demanding major concessions including wage reductions, reduced pension contributions and the removal of several staff divisions from the bargaining unit.

In June 2018, Saltwire Network changed the Carbonear-based weekly newspaper, The Compass, from a subscriber model to a free total market product deliver as a flyer package wrap.

In July 2019, Saltwire Network closed The Beacon, The Advertiser, The Pilot and The Nor'wester, and merged them into a free weekly known as The Central Voice—which began publication on August 1, 2018.

In March 2019, all SaltWire publications introduced metered paywalls.

In March 2019, SaltWire announced the sale of 10 of its buildings across Atlantic Canada.

Also in March 2019, the company terminated its affiliation with the Canadian Press newswire service, opting instead to become a client of Postmedia and Reuters.

In April 2019, SaltWire announced it was turning Corner Brook-based The Western Star into a weekly delivered free to consumers as a flyer wrap. This resulted in the layoff of around 30 employees. Independent delivery contractors were also affected. At the same time, it was announced that the two Labrador weeklies would merge into one called The Labrador Voice.

In April 2019, SaltWire filed a lawsuit in the Supreme Court of Nova Scotia against Transcontinental, accusing it of overstating and misrepresenting details surrounding the revenue of the papers it had acquired. The company threatened a counter-suit, stating that the sale was "conducted based on fair, accurate and timely information", and accusing SaltWire of failing to "fulfil its payment obligations".

Publications

Newfoundland and Labrador
The Telegram (St. John's)
West Coast Wire

Nova Scotia
Annapolis Valley Register (Windsor)
Bedford Wire (Free weekly)
Cape Breton Post (Sydney)
The Casket (Antigonish)
The Chronicle Herald (Nova Scotia)
Clayton Park Wire (Free weekly)
Coastal Wire (Free weekly)
Cobequid Wire (Free weekly)
Colchester Wire (Truro)
Cole Harbour Wire (Free weekly)
Cumberland Wire (Free weekly)
Dartmouth Wire (Free weekly)
Halifax Wire (Free weekly)
South Shore Breaker (Free weekly)
Southwest Wire (Free weekly)
The Tri-County Vanguard (Yarmouth)
The News (Pictou)
Truro News (Truro)
Valley Journal Advertiser (Windsor)
Valley Wire (Free weekly)

Prince Edward Island
The Guardian (Charlottetown)
The Journal-Pioneer (Summerside)

References

Newspaper companies of Canada
Companies based in Halifax, Nova Scotia
Canadian companies established in 2017
Mass media companies established in 2017
2017 establishments in Nova Scotia